Boston Blackie is a 1923 American crime film directed by Scott R. Dunlap and written by Paul Schofield. The film stars William Russell, Eva Novak, Frank Brownlee, Otto Matieson, W. C. Robinson and Fred Esmelton. The film was released on May 6, 1923, by Fox Film Corporation.

Cast           
William Russell as Boston Blackie
Eva Novak as Mary Carter
Frank Brownlee as Warden Benton
Otto Matieson as Danny Carter
W. C. Robinson as Shorty McNutt 
Fred Esmelton as John Gilmore

References

External links
 

1923 films
American crime films
1923 crime films
Fox Film films
Films directed by Scott R. Dunlap
American silent feature films
American black-and-white films
1920s English-language films
1920s American films
English-language crime films